Gau Vigyan Anusandhan Kendra, literally Cow-science research center, is a research institute located in the town of Deolapar near the city of Nagpur in India. The institution focuses on research and development on the role of Cow and its progeny in human life cycle.

Controversy
In May 2019, Gau Vigyan Anusandhan Kendra claimed that cow urine can cure cancer, even though there are no peer-reviewed and endorsed scientific basis.

References

External links 
 Govigyan

Research institutes in Maharashtra
Animal welfare organisations based in India
Year of establishment missing